A HEAT repeat is a protein tandem repeat structural motif composed of two alpha helices linked by a short loop. HEAT repeats can form alpha solenoids, a type of solenoid protein domain found in a number of cytoplasmic proteins. The name "HEAT" is an acronym for four proteins in which this repeat structure is found: Huntingtin, elongation factor 3 (EF3), protein phosphatase 2A (PP2A), and the yeast kinase TOR1. HEAT repeats form extended superhelical structures which are often involved in intracellular transport; they are structurally related to armadillo repeats. The nuclear transport protein importin beta contains 19 HEAT repeats.

Various HEAT repeat proteins and their structures
Representative examples of HEAT repeat proteins include importin β (also known as karyopherin β) family, regulatory subunits of condensin and cohesin, separase, PIKKs (phosphatidylinositol 3-kinase-related protein kinases) such as ATM (Ataxia telangiectasia mutated) and ATR (Ataxia telangiectasia and Rad3 related), and the microtubule-binding protein XMAP215/Dis1/TOG and CLASP. Thus, cellular functions of HEAT repeat proteins are highly variable.

The structure of the following HEAT repeat proteins have been determined so far:

Protein modification and degradation
A subunit and holoenzyme of PP2A
SCFubiquitin ligase regulator Cand1
Hsm3, a molecular chaperon involved in the assembly of 26Sproteasome
Nucleo-cytoplasmic transport
Importin β
Exportin Cse1
Transportin 1
Nuleoporin Gle1; Nup188; Nup192
Transcriptional regulation
TFIID subunit TAF6
TBP regulator Mot1（Modifier of transcription 1）
Transcriptional initiation factor Rrn3
Translational regulation
Elongation factor eEF3
Initiation factor eIF4G
Aminoacyl tRNA synthetase transfer protein Cex1p
DNA repair
DNA-PK (DNA-dependent protein kinase)
Fanconi anemia responsible protein FANCF (FANCF)
Damaged DNA-binding protein AlkD (Alkylpurin DNA glycosylase)
PIKKs chaperone Tel2
Chromosomal regulation
Cohesin subunit SA2/Scc3
Cohesin regulator Wapl
Cohesin regulator Pds5
Cohesin loading factor Scc2
Cohesin protease Separase
Condensin subunit CAP-G/ycg1
Condensin subunit CAP-D2/ycs4
Cytoskeletal regulation
Microtubule-binding protein TOG/Stu2
Cell proliferation regulation
TOR (target of rapamycin)
Others
API5 (Apoptosis inhibitor 5)
V-type ATPase H subunit

References

External links